Cup coral may refer to several different taxa of coral including:

 Balanophyllia bonaespei, a species in the family Dendrophylliidae
 Turbinaria, a genus in the family Dendrophylliidae